John George Scott was an English professional footballer who played as an outside left in the Football League for Grimsby Town and Newcastle United.

Personal life 
Scott served in the British Army during the First World War.

Career statistics

References

1890 births
Sportspeople from Wallsend
Footballers from Tyne and Wear
English footballers
Wallsend Slipway F.C. players
Newcastle United F.C. players
Grimsby Town F.C. players
Cleethorpes Town F.C. players
Charlton's F.C. players
English Football League players
Year of death missing
British Army personnel of World War I
Association football outside forwards